Kishan Lal Diler (1931-2008) was an Indian politician. He stood for the 2004 Lok Sabha elections on the Bharatiya Janata Party (BJP) ticket from Hathras (MP from 1996-2009). He died at Aligarh.

External links
 Official biography from Parliament of India records

References 

1931 births
2008 deaths
Bharatiya Janata Party politicians from Uttar Pradesh
Politicians from Aligarh
People from Hathras district
India MPs 2004–2009
Lok Sabha members from Uttar Pradesh
India MPs 1996–1997
India MPs 1998–1999
India MPs 1999–2004